This is a list of scientific units named after people. For other lists of eponyms (names derived from people) see eponym.
Note that by convention, the name of the unit is properly written in all-lowercase, but its abbreviation is capitalized.

SI base units
 ampere (A), electric currentAndré-Marie Ampère
 kelvin (K), thermodynamic temperatureLord Kelvin

SI derived unit
 becquerel (Bq), radioactivityHenri Becquerel
 degree Celsius (°C), temperatureAnders Celsius
 coulomb (C), electric chargeCharles-Augustin de Coulomb
 farad (F), capacitanceMichael Faraday
 gray (Gy), absorbed dose of radiation – Louis Harold Gray
 henry (H), inductanceJoseph Henry
 hertz (Hz), frequencyHeinrich Rudolf Hertz
 joule (J), energy, work, heatJames Prescott Joule
 newton (N), forceIsaac Newton
 ohm (Ω), electrical resistanceGeorg Ohm
 pascal (Pa), pressureBlaise Pascal
 siemens (S), electrical conductanceWerner von Siemens
 sievert (Sv), radiation dose equivalentRolf Sievert
 tesla (T), magnetic flux densityNikola Tesla
 volt (V), electric potential, electromotive forceAlessandro Volta
 watt (W), power, radiant fluxJames Watt
 weber (Wb), magnetic fluxWilhelm Eduard Weber

Centimetre–gram–second system of units
 biot (Bi), electric currentJean-Baptiste Biot
 buckingham (B), electric quadrupole momentA. David Buckingham
 debye (D), electric dipole momentPeter Debye
 eotvos (E), gravitational gradientLoránd Eötvös
 galileo (Gal), accelerationGalileo Galilei
 gauss (G or Gs), magnetic flux densityCarl Friedrich Gauss
 gilbert (Gb), magnetomotive forceWilliam Gilbert
 goeppert-mayer (GM), two-photon absorption cross sectionMaria Goeppert-Mayer
 kayser (kayser), wavenumberHeinrich Kayser
 maxwell (Mx), magnetic fluxJames Clerk Maxwell
 oersted (Oe), magnetic field strengthHans Christian Ørsted
 poise (P), dynamic viscosityJean Léonard Marie Poiseuille
 Rayl or Rayleigh (Rayl), acoustic impedanceJohn William Strutt, 3rd Baron Rayleigh
 rayleigh (R), photon fluxRobert John Strutt, 4th Baron Rayleigh
 stokes (S or St), kinematic viscosityGeorge Gabriel Stokes

No longer in use
 franklin (Fr), electric chargeBenjamin Franklin
 clausius (Cl), entropyRudolf Clausius

Others
 ångström (Å), distanceAnders Jonas Ångström
 baud (Bd), symbol rateEmile Baudot
 Bark scale, psychoacoustical scaleHeinrich Barkhausen
 brewster (B), stress optic coefficientDavid Brewster
 centimorgan (cM), recombination frequencyThomas Hunt Morgan
 curie (Ci), radioactivityMarie and Pierre Curie
 dalton (Da), atomic massJohn Dalton
 darcy (D), permeability,Henry Darcy  
 decibel (dB) dimensionless proportions and ratios, e.g. relative power levelsAlexander Graham Bell
 degree Fahrenheit (°F), temperatureDaniel Gabriel Fahrenheit
 degree Rankine (°R), temperatureWilliam John Macquorn Rankine
 Dobson unit (DU), atmospheric ozoneGordon Dobson
 erlang (E), dimensionless volume of telecommunications trafficAgner Krarup Erlang
 fermi (fm), distanceEnrico Fermi
 hartley (Hart), informationRalph Hartley
 Hounsfield scale, radiodensityGodfrey Newbold Hounsfield
 jansky (Jy), electromagnetic fluxKarl Jansky
 langley (ly), solar radiationSamuel Pierpont Langley
 langmuir (L), gas exposure doseIrving Langmuir
 Mach number (Ma), relative speedErnst Mach
 neper (Np), relative power levelJohn Napier
 degree Öchsle (°Oe), densityFerdinand Öchsle
 Rockwell scale (HR), indentation hardnessStanley Rockwell
 röntgen (R), dosage of X-rays or gamma radiationWilhelm Röntgen
 Richter magnitude, earthquake powerCharles Francis Richter
 Scoville units, capsaicin content of chili peppersWilbur Scoville
 shannon (Sh), informationClaude Shannon
 siegbahn (xu), distanceManne Siegbahn
 svedberg (S or Sv), sedimentation rateTheodor Svedberg
 sverdrup (Sv), volume transport rateHarald Sverdrup
 torr (Torr), pressureEvangelista Torricelli
 troland (Td), luminance (human eye)Leonard Troland

Natural unit systems
 Planck unitsMax Planck
 Stoney unitsGeorge Stoney

No longer in use
 Mercalli intensity scale, earthquake effectsGiuseppe Mercalli
 degree Réaumur (°R), temperature René Antoine Ferchault de Réaumur
 degree Delisle (°D), temperatureJoseph-Nicolas Delisle
 degree Newton (°N), temperatureIsaac Newton
 degree Rømer (°Rø), temperatureOle Rømer
 degree Baumé (°Bé), densityAntoine Baumé
 einstein (E), photochemistryAlbert Einstein
 poncelet (p), powerJean-Victor Poncelet
 faraday (Fd), electrical chargeMichael Faraday

See also
 List of eponyms
 Lists of etymologies
 List of obsolete units of measurement
 List of unusual units of measurement
 List of humorous units of measurement
 List of scientists whose names are used as SI units
 List of scientists whose names are used as non SI units

References

Scientific units
Units